Baantjer is a Dutch television programme which was broadcast by RTL 4 from 6 October 1995 until 1 December 2006 for a total of 123 episodes in 12 seasons. It stars Piet Römer as Jurriaan 'Jurre' de Cock, a police detective, and Victor Reinier as Dick Vledder, his helper. The series is based on the novels of writer A. C. Baantjer.

In 1999, RTL 4 broadcast the television film Baantjer, de film: De Cock en de wraak zonder einde because of the tenth anniversary of the network.

In 2018, it was announced by RTL that the series would be revived for a thirteenth season and a film, starring Waldemar Torenstra, that would be aired on RTL 4 and Videoland. The film Amsterdam Vice (Baantjer: Het Begin) won the Golden Film award two weeks after its premiere on 18 April 2019.

Cast

References 

Dutch drama television series
Television shows based on Dutch novels
1990s Dutch television series
2000s Dutch television series
1995 Dutch television series debuts
2006 Dutch television series endings
RTL 4 original programming